The Return of Count Yorga (originally titled Yorga Returns) is a 1971 American vampire horror film directed by Bob Kelljan and starring Robert Quarry, Roger Perry, Yvonne Wilder, George Macready, Rudy De Luca, Edward Walsh, and Craig T. Nelson in his feature film debut. It is the sequel to the 1970 film Count Yorga, Vampire.

The story features Quarry returning as the infamous vampire Count Yorga, along with his servant Brudah, both of whom have been revived by the supernatural Santa Ana winds. Actor Roger Perry, who had a lead role in the first film, appears again but as a different character.

Plot 

Cynthia Nelson, a teacher at the local orphanage, talks with the pastor while watching the sun set. They are preparing the orphanage for a fundraising costume party. Cynthia mentions the "Santa Ana winds" which the pastor states are an evil omen. One of the orphans, Tommy, wanders into the nearby cemetery where he faintly hears a voice ordering, "Rise, rise, it is time." Tommy dismisses it, but vampire women rise from their graves. Tommy tries to escape the cemetery but runs into the waiting Count Yorga.

Yorga goes to the orphanage during the costume party. He bites one of the pretty guests, Mitzi, outside the event room before going inside and introducing himself to those present. He becomes infatuated with Cynthia. When a weakened Mitzi stumbles into the room, Yorga leaves as the others attend to her. That night, he returns to his manor and a makeshift throne room overlooking several coffins, greeted by Brudda, Yorga's hulking, disfigured valet, and the female vampires from the cemetery. Yorga sends the undead women to Cynthia's house, using mind-control to get Cynthia's family (along with Tommy, who was sleeping over) into the living room before his brides break in and attack them. The family is quickly overrun. Cynthia's mother, father and sister, Ellen, are fed upon by the undead horde. Tommy is untouched, revealing he is under Yorga's power. Cynthia herself is subdued, but unharmed and carried by the brides to Yorga's residence where she awakens. Due to Yorga's hypnotic suggestions, she has no memory of the attack. Yorga tells Cynthia that there was a car accident and she was left in his care by her family.  He tries to charm the young woman into willingly becoming his bride, though he is warned by his live-in witch that Cynthia will bring his end if he does not kill her or turn her into a vampire soon.

The next morning, Jennifer, the Nelsons' mute maid, finds the massacre scene along with Tommy and calls the police. However, as she does, Bruhda silently arrives drags away the corpses of Cynthia's mother and father to a quicksand pit on Yorga's property, disposing of the physical evidence. By the time the police arrive, all of the evidence has been cleared away. Tommy claims that nothing has happened. Despite the confusion, David Baldwin, Cynthia's fiancé, is suspicious about the Nelsons' disappearance. Meanwhile, memories of the attack on her family slowly start to resurface in Cynthia's mind as she stays within Yorga's manor. Jennifer, suspicious about Tommy's involvement with the Nelsons' disappearance and his visits to Yorga's mansion, loses her patience and slaps Tommy who stares at her in a vengeful manner. Meanwhile, Yorga goes to claim Mitzi, killing her boyfriend near their boat house before feeding on her once more, draining her completely and adding her to his vampiric harem.

Hours later, Ellen's fiancé Jason is lured to Yorga's mansion by Tommy, on the claim that he found Ellen. Once at the mansion, Tommy disappears, while Jason is reunited with Ellen who has clearly been made into a vampire by Yorga. As she mocks him for "not loving her anymore" and soon starts laughing cruelly at him when he sense something wrong, her fellow brides attack Jason from behind. Jason breaks free, only to run into Count Yorga, who chases Jason down a hall and strangles him. Bruddah tosses Jason's body into the throne/coffin room for the brides, including Ellen and newly vampiric Mitzi, to feed upon.

That evening, Reverend Thomas phones Jennifer, but it is revealed she lies dead on her bed with a large knife sticking out of her chest. From her window, Tommy can be seen walking away from the house. After Thomas learns of Jennifer's death, David is sure he is correct about the Count's true nature and manages to convince Reverend Thomas and investigating police detectives Lt. Madden and Sgt. O'Connor to join him in a rescue-mission at Yorga's mansion. Reverend Thomas is sent to distract Yorga while Baldwin, Madden and O'Connor sneak in to search the manor, armed with sticks they can cross and hold up to ward off the vampires.  Meanwhile, the pastor falls for Yorga's charms and reveals the others' suspicions that he is a vampire, alerting Yorga of danger.  Thomas is tricked into walking into the quicksand pit and promptly sinks to his death. Yorga returns to the manor, awakens his brides and unleashes them through the household as he psychically calls Cynthia to him.

Baldwin splits from the detectives to expand the room-by-room search, and upon opening one door discovers Jason's corpse, covered in bloody bite marks with an IV draining remaining blood from his neck into a glass-bottle on the floor beneath him. Later, Baldwin finally finds the half-mind-controlled Cynthia and attempts to escape; however, he is nearly beaten by Brudda. Falling into a suit of armor,  Baldwin grabs a metal mace and knocks Brudda out with a violent blow to the face.

Meanwhile, Madden and O'Connor come across Yorga's vampire brides. When the women don't respond to their question and continue tho silently advance on them. the detectives attempt to shoot them point blank, but their bullets prove ineffective as the undead women continue to give chase. In the midst of their escape, they encounter Brudda and managed to shoot him to death. Eventually O'Connor is separated in the brides' throne/coffin room by a shutter and immediately attacked from behind and bitten by the witch (also a vampire) as Madden helplessly listens to O'Connor's death-screams. Madden tries to find a way to him, but he gets lured in by a voice from the shadows (thinking it is Baldwin) and then killed by Tommy who stabs him in the same way he murdered Jennifer.

Baldwin and Cynthia are the only ones left alive, with Yorga supernaturally mocking Baldwin throughout the estate. Yorga seals their exit routes while his brides slowly close in on the two. They duck into a darkened hallway, but when Baldwin turns on the lights, he finds himself confronted by all the brides (including Ellen and Mitzi) with Yorga behind them who calls Cynthia over to his side. Yorga takes her away, preparing to turn her into his new bride while leaving his army of brides to finish off Baldwin. He is about to take her when he hears Baldwin scream his name, who seemingly has escaped the brides. Yorga takes Cynthia and flees to the upper balcony of the estate as Baldwin (who grabs an iron battle-axe from a wall) chases the two. Yorga and Baldwin fight with Baldwin surprisingly seeming stronger than before, however, Yorga gains the advantage. Just as he is about to kill Baldwin via choking, Cynthia's memories of the brides killing her family resurface, causing her to realize Yorga was responsible for their deaths. She strikes Yorga in the chest with Baldwin's battle-axe. With Yorga stunned by the action, Baldwin uses the moment to throw Yorga off the balcony, and he lay motionless on the pavement below, dead.

Cynthia hugs Baldwin, believing the ordeal over. However, she notices something wrong and pulls away. To her horror, she sees that Baldwin's skin has turned pale and bite marks are on his face, revealing that he has transformed into a vampire (having apparently not escaped from the brides unscathed). Cynthia tries to run from him, but Baldwin pulls her back and promptly bites her.

The last shot of the movie is Tommy playing with his ball in front of the orphanage accompanied by a haunting rendition of the song the children sang at the beginning of the film. Though Yorga is dead, his evil lives on as those who know of him are either dead or turned into vampires and will carry out his curse. The film ends with the ominous implication that Cynthia has joined them, Baldwin now their new leader and the surviving vampires are resting within the manor, where they will proceed to spread the vampirisim to the unwitting orphanage and soon to the rest of the town.

Cast 
Robert Quarry as Count Yorga
Mariette Hartley as Cynthia Nelson
Roger Perry as Dr. David Baldwin
Yvonne Wilder as Jennifer Nelson
George Macready as Prof. Rightstat
Rudy De Luca as Lt. Madden
Edward Walsh as Brudda
Craig T. Nelson as Sgt. O'Connor
Tom Toner as Rev. Thomas Westwood 
Walter Brooke as Bill Nelson
David Lampson as Jason
Helen Baron as Mrs. Liza Nelson
Karen Ericson as Ellen Nelson
Jesse Welles as Mitzi Carthay

Production 
In one scene, Yorga is seen watching a Spanish-language version of The Vampire Lovers on his television.

Planned sequel 
A third Yorga film, which would have featured a broken Count Yorga living in Los Angeles's sewers and creating an army of undead street people, never materialised.

Though Count Yorga is referred to as "the Deathmaster" in publicity for this film, a later film called The Deathmaster, also starring Robert Quarry as a vampire, has no relation to the Count Yorga series.

Release 
The film was released theatrically in the US by American International Pictures in 1971.

The film was released on VHS home video (full screen format) in 1993 by Orion Home Video, which once held home video distribution rights to many titles in the American International Pictures catalog.

The film was given a second VHS release by MGM Home Entertainment in September 2000. It later was released on DVD by MGM in 2005 as part of its Midnite Movies series. The disc was a double-feature release, pairing the film with Count Yorga, Vampire.

When CBS ran the movie in the 1970s on its Friday Night Late Movie, the on-screen title was Yorga Returns.

Reception
Howard Thompson of The New York Times panned the film as "a dull, amateurish vampire brew." Variety called it "a solid follow-up" to the original and "a handsome-looking film which rings the bell on both the shocker and satirical level." Gene Siskel of the Chicago Tribune gave the film three-and-a-half stars out of four, calling it "extremely frightening" and adding, "Persons familiar with the original will find the sequel better photographed, better acted and containing more mayhem a minute." Kevin Thomas of the Los Angeles Times wrote, "Those who saw 'Count Yorga' will be disappointed. Those who only see 'The Return' will wonder what all the fuss was about in regard to the original. In the first film comedy gave way to terror; in this self-conscious sequel the two elements tend to cancel each other out. The result is a pretty silly show." David Pirie of The Monthly Film Bulletin wrote that Count Yorga had been resurrected "with considerably more enterprise and panache than before." He praised the acting as being "of a generally high standard" and the castle set as "skilfully utilised to give the impression of a labyrinth of Borgesian proportions," though he criticized "a totally unnecessary and feeble attempt to make the Count into a sympathetic figure through such lines as, 'The most fragile emotion ever known has entered my breast.'"

See also
 List of American films of 1971

References

External links 
 

1971 films
1971 horror films
1970s comedy horror films
American vampire films
American International Pictures films
1971 comedy films
American comedy horror films
Films directed by Bob Kelljan
Films set in country houses
1970s English-language films
1970s American films